Godawari is a municipality in Lalitpur District in Bagmati Province of Nepal. It was established on 2 December 2014 by merging the former Village development committees Godawari, Badikhel, Bisankhunarayan, Godamchaur and Thaiba of Lalitpur District of Bagmati Zone. The municipality area was again expanded in March 2017 to include in total 12 previous VDCs. The six VDCs added were Devichaur, Dukuchhap, Chhampi, Thecho, Chapagaun, Jharuwarasi and Lele. The centre of this municipality is located at Bajrabarahi.

Demographics
At the time of the 2011 Nepal census, Godawari Municipality had a population of 80,376. Of these, 49.7% spoke Nepali, 27.5% Newar, 15.3% Tamang, 2.4% Pahari, 1.1% Danwar, 0.9% Magar, 0.6% Maithili, 0.6% Rai, 0.3% Bhojpuri and 1.6% other languages as their first language.

In terms of ethnicity/caste, 28.6% were Newar, 26.8% Chhetri, 16.2% Tamang, 10.8% Hill Brahmin, 4.3% Pahari, 2.7% Magar, 1.9% Sarki, 1.3% Kami, 1.1% Danuwar and 6.3% others.

In terms of religion, 80.6% were Hindu, 13.9% Buddhist, 4.8% Christian, 0.4% Muslim and 0.3% Kirati.

Landmarks
Godawari is one of the popular hiking destinations in Nepal for its rich wildlife and splendid environment. Godawari is also famous for its botanical garden and Godawari temple (Kunda and navadhara). Mt. Phulchowki is located in Godawari which is the highest peak in Kathmandu valley.

Ghatghar Dam was built for hydropower generation by diverting the water of the Pravara tributary outside the Godawari river basin to a west-flowing river which joins the Arabian sea.

Media
To promote local culture, Godawari one FM radio station ECR FM - 104.2 MHz, which is a Community Radio Station.

References

External links
 Godawari Municipality Official Page

Municipalities in Lalitpur District, Nepal